"If You Have to Ask" is a song by the Red Hot Chili Peppers from their 1991 studio album Blood Sugar Sex Magik. It was released as the album's fifth and final single in 1993.

A music video was made, but merely consists of live footage of the band from a 1992 show at the Winter Show Buildings in Wellington, New Zealand overdubbed with the original album track. The video is notable because it is one of only two videos to feature guitarist Arik Marshall ("Breaking the Girl" being the other). The video was rarely aired on music television and the song along with the video was not featured on the band's Greatest Hits album. Like the song "Aeroplane" from their 1995 album One Hot Minute, it was one of the two music videos from the Warner era not available on their official app.
 
The verses of the song consist of a scratchy, minimalist funk lick played on the guitar, with a busier bass melody playing behind it. The lyrics in the verses are a stream of consciousness style run of non-sequiturs, which the chorus then explains by stating "If you have to ask, you'll never know". While guitarist John Frusciante finishes the solo at the end of the song, the production crew and the band can be heard applauding him. However, no attempts were made to edit out the applause or to re-record it like with all other unintended sounds found on the album.

Live performances 
"If You Have to Ask" has been performed on every tour since 1991.

Track listing
CD single (1993) 
 "If You Have to Ask" (edit)
 "If You Have to Ask" (Disco Krisco Mix)
 "If You Have to Ask" (Scott And Garth Mix)
 "Give It Away" (In Progress)

12" single (1993)
 "If You Have to Ask" (Disco Krisco Mix)
 "If You Have to Ask" (album)
 "If You Have to Ask" (Friday Night Fever Blister Mix)
 "Give It Away" (In Progress)

Personnel
Red Hot Chili Peppers
Anthony Kiedis - lead vocals
John Frusciante - guitar, synthesizer, backing vocals
Flea - bass, backing vocals
Chad Smith - drums, tambourine

References

Red Hot Chili Peppers songs
1991 songs
1993 singles
Song recordings produced by Rick Rubin
Songs written by Flea (musician)
Songs written by John Frusciante
Songs written by Anthony Kiedis
Songs written by Chad Smith